New Winchester is an unincorporated community in Marion Township, Hendricks County, Indiana.

History
New Winchester was laid out in 1832. A post office was established at New Winchester in 1837, and remained in operation until it was discontinued in 1904.

The local high school operated from 1914 to 1963, before being consolidated into Danville High School for the 1963–64 school year.

Geography

References

Unincorporated communities in Hendricks County, Indiana
Unincorporated communities in Indiana
Indianapolis metropolitan area